The fall of Constantinople, also known as the conquest of Constantinople, was the capture of the capital of the Byzantine Empire by the Ottoman Empire. The city was captured on 29 May 1453 as part of the culmination of a 53-day siege which had begun on 6 April.  

The attacking Ottoman Army, which significantly outnumbered Constantinople's defenders, was commanded by the 21-year-old Sultan Mehmed II (later nicknamed "the Conqueror"), while the Byzantine army was led by Emperor Constantine XI Palaiologos. After conquering the city, Mehmed II made Constantinople the new Ottoman capital, replacing Adrianople.

The conquest of Constantinople and the fall of the Byzantine Empire was a watershed of the Late Middle Ages, marking the effective end of the last remains of the Roman Empire, a state which began in roughly 27 BC and had lasted nearly  1500 years. Among many modern historians, the fall of Constantinople is considered the end of the medieval period. The city's fall also stood as a turning point in military history. Since ancient times, cities and castles had depended upon ramparts and walls to repel invaders. The Walls of Constantinople, especially the Theodosian Walls, were some of the most advanced defensive systems in the world at the time. These fortifications were overcome with the use of gunpowder, specifically in the form of large cannons and bombards, heralding a change in siege warfare.

State of the Byzantine Empire
Constantinople had been an imperial capital since its consecration in 330 under Roman emperor Constantine the Great. In the following eleven centuries, the city had been besieged many times but was captured only once before: the Sack of Constantinople during the Fourth Crusade in 1204. The crusaders established an unstable Latin state in and around Constantinople while the remainder of the Byzantine Empire splintered into a number of successor states, notably Nicaea, Epirus and Trebizond. They fought as allies against the Latin establishments, but also fought among themselves for the Byzantine throne.

The Nicaeans eventually reconquered Constantinople from the Latins in 1261, reestablishing the Byzantine Empire under the Palaiologos dynasty. Thereafter, there was little peace for the much-weakened empire as it fended off successive attacks by the Latins, Serbs, Bulgarians and Ottoman Turks.

Between 1346 and 1349 the Black Death killed almost half of the inhabitants of Constantinople. The city was further depopulated by the general economic and territorial decline of the empire, and by 1453, it consisted of a series of walled villages separated by vast fields encircled by the fifth-century Theodosian Walls.

By 1450, the empire was exhausted and had shrunk to a few square kilometers outside the city of Constantinople itself, the Princes' Islands in the Sea of Marmara and the Peloponnese with its cultural center at Mystras. The Empire of Trebizond, an independent successor state that formed in the aftermath of the Fourth Crusade, was also present at the time on the coast of the Black Sea.

Preparations
When Mehmed II succeeded his father in 1451, he was just nineteen years old. Many European courts assumed that the young Ottoman ruler would not seriously challenge Christian hegemony in the Balkans and the Aegean. In fact, Europe celebrated Mehmed coming to the throne and hoped his inexperience would lead the Ottomans astray. This calculation was boosted by Mehmed's friendly overtures to the European envoys at his new court. But Mehmed's mild words were not matched by his actions. By early 1452, work began on the construction of a second fortress (Rumeli hisarı) on the European side of the Bosphorus, several miles north of Constantinople. The new fortress sat directly across the strait from the Anadolu Hisarı fortress, built by Mehmed's great-grandfather Bayezid I. This pair of fortresses ensured complete control of sea traffic on the Bosphorus and defended against attack by the Genoese colonies on the Black Sea coast to the north. In fact, the new fortress was called Boğazkesen, which means "strait-blocker" or "throat-cutter". The wordplay emphasizes its strategic position: in Turkish boğaz means both "strait" and "throat". In October 1452, Mehmed ordered Turakhan Beg to station a large garrison force in the Peloponnese to block Thomas and Demetrios (despotes in Southern Greece) from providing aid to their brother Constantine XI Palaiologos during the impending siege of Constantinople. Karaca Pasha, the beylerbeyi of Rumelia, sent men to prepare the roads from Adrianople to Constantinople so that bridges could cope with the massive cannons. Fifty carpenters and 200 artisans also strengthened the roads where necessary. The Greek historian Michael Critobulus quotes Mehmed II's speech to his soldiers before the siege:

European support
Byzantine Emperor Constantine XI swiftly understood Mehmed's true intentions and turned to Western Europe for help; but now the price of centuries of war and enmity between the eastern and western churches had to be paid. Since the mutual excommunications of 1054, the Pope in Rome was committed to establishing unity with the eastern church. The union was agreed by the Byzantine Emperor Michael VIII Palaiologos in 1274, at the Second Council of Lyon, and indeed, some Palaiologoi emperors had since been received into the Latin Church. Emperor John VIII Palaiologos had also recently negotiated union with Pope Eugene IV, with the Council of Florence of 1439 proclaiming a Bull of Union. The imperial efforts to impose union were met with strong resistance in Constantinople. A propaganda initiative was stimulated by anti-unionist Orthodox partisans in Constantinople; the population, as well as the laity and leadership of the Byzantine Church, became bitterly divided. Latent ethnic hatred between Greeks and Italians, stemming from the events of the Massacre of the Latins in 1182 by the Greeks and the Sack of Constantinople in 1204 by the Latins, played a significant role. Ultimately, the attempted union between east and west failed, greatly annoying Pope Nicholas V and the hierarchy of the Roman church.

In the summer of 1452, when Rumeli Hisarı was completed and the threat of the Ottomans had become imminent, Constantine wrote to the Pope, promising to implement the union, which was declared valid by a half-hearted imperial court on 12 December 1452. Although he was eager for an advantage, Pope Nicholas V did not have the influence the Byzantines thought he had over the Western kings and princes, some of whom were wary of increasing papal control. Furthermore, these Western rulers did not have the wherewithal to contribute to the effort, especially in light of the weakened state of France and England from the Hundred Years' War, Spain's involvement in the Reconquista, the internecine fighting in the Holy Roman Empire, and Hungary and Poland's defeat at the Battle of Varna of 1444. Although some troops did arrive from the mercantile city-states in northern Italy, the Western contribution was not adequate to counterbalance Ottoman strength. Some Western individuals, however, came to help defend the city on their own account. Cardinal Isidore, funded by the Pope, arrived in 1452 with 200 archers. An accomplished soldier from Genoa, Giovanni Giustiniani, arrived in January 1453 with 400 men from Genoa and 300 men from Genoese Chios. As a specialist in defending walled cities, Giustiniani was immediately given the overall command of the defence of the land walls by the Emperor. The Byzantines knew him by the Latin spelling of his name, "John Justinian", named after the famous 6th century Byzantine emperor Justinian the Great.  Around the same time, the captains of the Venetian ships that happened to be present in the Golden Horn offered their services to the Emperor, barring contrary orders from Venice, and Pope Nicholas undertook to send three ships laden with provisions, which set sail near the end of March.

Meanwhile, in Venice, deliberations were taking place concerning the kind of assistance the Republic would lend to Constantinople. The Senate decided upon sending a fleet in February 1453, but the fleet's departure was delayed until April, when it was already too late for ships to assist in battle. Further undermining Byzantine morale, seven Italian ships with around 700 men, despite having sworn to defend Constantinople, slipped out of the capital the moment Giustiniani arrived. At the same time, Constantine's attempts to appease the Sultan with gifts ended with the execution of the Emperor's ambassadors.

Fearing a possible naval attack along the shores of the Golden Horn, Emperor Constantine XI ordered that a defensive chain be placed at the mouth of the harbour. This chain, which floated on logs, was strong enough to prevent any Turkish ship from entering the harbour. This device was one of two that gave the Byzantines some hope of extending the siege until the possible arrival of foreign help. This strategy was used because in 1204, the armies of the Fourth Crusade successfully circumvented Constantinople's land defences by breaching the Golden Horn Wall, which faces the Horn. Another strategy employed by the Byzantines was the repair and fortification of the Land Wall (Theodosian Walls). Emperor Constantine deemed it necessary to ensure that the Blachernae district's wall was the most fortified because that section of the wall protruded northwards.

Strength

The army defending Constantinople was relatively small, totalling about 7,000 men, 2,000 of whom were foreigners. At the onset of the siege, probably fewer than 50,000 people were living within the walls, including the refugees from the surrounding area.  Turkish commander Dorgano, who was in Constantinople working for the Emperor, was also guarding one of the quarters of the city on the seaward side with the Turks in his pay. These Turks kept loyal to the Emperor and perished in the ensuing battle. The defending army's Genoese corps were well trained and equipped, while the rest of the army consisted of small numbers of well-trained soldiers, armed civilians, sailors and volunteer forces from foreign communities, and finally monks. The garrison used a few small-calibre artillery pieces, which in the end proved ineffective. The rest of the citizens repaired walls, stood guard on observation posts, collected and distributed food provisions, and collected gold and silver objects from churches to melt down into coins to pay the foreign soldiers.

The Ottomans had a much larger force. Recent studies and Ottoman archival data state that there were some 50,000–80,000 Ottoman soldiers, including between 5,000 and 10,000 Janissaries, 70 cannons, and an elite infantry corps, and thousands of Christian troops, notably 1,500 Serbian cavalry that Đurađ Branković was forced to supply as part of his obligation to the Ottoman sultan —just a few months before, Branković had supplied the money for the reconstruction of the walls of Constantinople. Contemporaneous Western witnesses of the siege, who tend to exaggerate the military power of the Sultan, provide disparate and higher numbers ranging from 160,000 to 300,000 (Niccolò Barbaro: 160,000; the Florentine merchant Jacopo Tedaldi and the Great Logothete George Sphrantzes: 200,000; the Cardinal Isidore of Kiev and the Archbishop of Mytilene Leonardo di Chio: 300,000).

Ottoman dispositions and strategies

Mehmed built a fleet (crewed partially by Spanish sailors from Gallipoli) to besiege the city from the sea. Contemporary estimates of the strength of the Ottoman fleet span from 110 ships to 430 (Tedaldi: 110; Barbaro: 145; Ubertino Pusculo: 160, Isidore of Kiev and Leonardo di Chio: 200–250; (Sphrantzes): 430). A more realistic modern estimate predicts a fleet strength of 110 ships comprising 70 large galleys, 5 ordinary galleys, 10 smaller galleys, 25 large rowing boats, and 75 horse-transports.

Before the siege of Constantinople, it was known that the Ottomans had the ability to cast medium-sized cannons, but the range of some pieces they were able to field far surpassed the defenders' expectations. The Ottomans deployed a number of cannons, anywhere from 12 to 62 cannons. They were built at foundries that employed Turkish cannon founders and technicians, most notably Saruca, in addition to at least one foreign cannon founder, Orban (also called Urban). Most of the cannons at the siege were built by Turkish engineers, including a large bombard by Saruca, while one cannon was built by Orban, who also contributed a large bombard.

Orban, a Hungarian (though some suggest he was German), was a somewhat mysterious figure. Orban initially tried to sell his services to the Byzantines, but they were unable to secure the funds needed to hire him. Orban then left Constantinople and approached Mehmed II, claiming that his weapon could blast "the walls of Babylon itself". Given abundant funds and materials, the Hungarian engineer built the gun within three months at Edirne. However, this was the only cannon that Orban built for the Ottoman forces at Constantinople, and it had several drawbacks: it took three hours to reload; cannonballs were in very short supply; and the cannon is said to have collapsed under its own recoil after six weeks. The account of the cannon's collapse is disputed, given that it was only reported in the letter of Archbishop Leonardo di Chio and in the later, and often unreliable, Russian chronicle of Nestor Iskander.

In preparation for the final assault, Mehmed had an artillery train of 70 large pieces dragged from his headquarters at Edirne, in addition to the bombards cast on the spot. This train included Orban's enormous cannon, which was said to have been dragged from Edirne by a crew of 60 oxen and over 400 men. There was another large bombard, independently built by Turkish engineer Saruca, that was also used in the battle.

Mehmed planned to attack the Theodosian Walls, the intricate series of walls and ditches protecting Constantinople from an attack from the West and the only part of the city not surrounded by water. His army encamped outside the city on 2 April 1453, the Monday after Easter.

The bulk of the Ottoman army was encamped south of the Golden Horn. The regular European troops, stretched out along the entire length of the walls, were commanded by Karadja Pasha. The regular troops from Anatolia under Ishak Pasha were stationed south of the Lycus down to the Sea of Marmara. Mehmed himself erected his red-and-gold tent near the Mesoteichion, where the guns and the elite Janissary regiments were positioned. The Bashi-bazouks were spread out behind the front lines. Other troops under Zagan Pasha were employed north of the Golden Horn. Communication was maintained by a road that had been destroyed over the marshy head of the Horn.

The Ottomans were experts in laying siege to cities. They knew that in order to prevent diseases they had to burn corpses, sanitarily dispose of excrement, and carefully scrutinize their sources of water.

Byzantine dispositions and tactics

The city had about 20 km of walls (land walls: 5.5 km; sea walls along the Golden Horn: 7 km; sea walls along the Sea of Marmara: 7.5 km), one of the strongest sets of fortified walls in existence. The walls had recently been repaired (under John VIII) and were in fairly good shape, giving the defenders sufficient reason to believe that they could hold out until help from the West arrived. In addition, the defenders were relatively well-equipped with a fleet of 26 ships: 5 from Genoa, 5 from Venice, 3 from Venetian Crete, 1 from Ancona, 1 from Aragon, 1 from France, and about 10 from the empire itself.

On 5 April, the Sultan himself arrived with his last troops, and the defenders took up their positions. As Byzantine numbers were insufficient to occupy the walls in their entirety, it had been decided that only the outer walls would be guarded. Constantine and his Greek troops guarded the Mesoteichion, the middle section of the land walls, where they were crossed by the river Lycus. This section was considered the weakest spot in the walls and an attack was feared here most. Giustiniani was stationed to the north of the emperor, at the Charisian Gate (Myriandrion); later during the siege, he was shifted to the Mesoteichion to join Constantine, leaving the Myriandrion to the charge of the Bocchiardi brothers.  and his Venetians were stationed in the Blachernae Palace, together with Teodoro Caristo, the Langasco brothers, and Archbishop Leonardo of Chios.

To the left of the emperor, further south, were the commanders Cataneo, who led Genoese troops, and Theophilus Palaeologus, who guarded the Pegae Gate with Greek soldiers. The section of the land walls from the Pegae Gate to the Golden Gate (itself guarded by a Genoese called Manuel) was defended by the Venetian Filippo Contarini, while Demetrius Cantacuzenus had taken position on the southernmost part of the Theodosian wall. The sea walls were guarded more sparsely, with Jacobo Contarini at Stoudion, a makeshift defence force of Greek monks to his left hand, and Prince Orhan at the Harbour of Eleutherios. Genoese and Catalan troops were stationed at the Great Palace; Cardinal Isidore of Kiev guarded the tip of the peninsula near the boom. Finally, the sea walls at the southern shore of the Golden Horn were defended by Venetian and Genoese sailors under Gabriele Trevisano.

Two tactical reserves were kept behind in the city: one in the Petra district just behind the land walls and one near the Church of the Holy Apostles, under the command of Loukas Notaras and Nicephorus Palaeologus, respectively. The Venetian Alviso Diedo commanded the ships in the harbour. Although the Byzantines also had cannons, the weapons were much smaller than those of the Ottomans, and the recoil tended to damage their own walls. According to David Nicolle, despite many odds, the idea that Constantinople was inevitably doomed is incorrect and the situation was not as one-sided as a simple glance at a map might suggest. It has also been claimed that Constantinople was "the best-defended city in Europe" at that time.

Siege

At the beginning of the siege, Mehmed sent out some of his best troops to reduce the remaining Byzantine strongholds outside the city of Constantinople. The fortress of Therapia on the Bosphorus and a smaller castle at the village of Studius near the Sea of Marmara were taken within a few days. The Princes' Islands in the Sea of Marmara were taken by Admiral Baltoghlu's fleet. Mehmed's massive cannons fired on the walls for weeks but due to their imprecision and extremely slow rate of fire, the Byzantines were able to repair most of the damage after each shot, mitigating the effect of the Ottoman artillery.

Despite some probing attacks, the Ottoman fleet under Baltoghlu could not enter the Golden Horn due to the chain across the entrance. Although one of the fleet's main tasks was to prevent any foreign ships from entering the Golden Horn, on 20 April, a small flotilla of four Christian ships managed to get in after some heavy fighting, an event which strengthened the morale of the defenders and caused embarrassment to the Sultan. Baltoghlu was most likely injured in the eye during the skirmish. Mehmed stripped Baltoghlu of his wealth and property and gave it to the janissaries and ordered him to be whipped 100 times.

Mehmed ordered the construction of a road of greased logs across Galata on the north side of the Golden Horn and dragged his ships over the hill, directly into the Golden Horn on 22 April, bypassing the chain barrier. This action seriously threatened the flow of supplies from Genoese ships from the nominally neutral colony of Pera and it demoralized the Byzantine defenders. On the night of 28 April, an attempt was made to destroy the Ottoman ships already in the Golden Horn using fire ships but the Ottomans forced the Christians to retreat with many casualties. Forty Italians escaped their sinking ships and swam to the northern shore.  On orders of Mehmed, they were impaled on stakes, in sight of the city's defenders on the sea walls across the Golden Horn. In retaliation, the defenders brought their Ottoman prisoners, 260 in all, to the walls, where they were executed, one by one, before the eyes of the Ottomans. With the failure of their attack on the Ottoman vessels, the defenders were forced to disperse part of their forces to defend the sea walls along the Golden Horn.

The Ottoman army had made several frontal assaults on the land wall of Constantinople, but they were costly failures. Venetian surgeon Niccolò Barbaro, describing in his diary one such land attack by the Janissaries, wrote

After these inconclusive attacks, the Ottomans sought to break through the walls by constructing tunnels to mine them from mid-May to 25 May. Many of the sappers were miners of Serbian origin sent from Novo Brdo under the command of Zagan Pasha. An engineer named Johannes Grant, a German who came with the Genoese contingent, had counter-mines dug, allowing Byzantine troops to enter the mines and kill the miners. The Byzantines intercepted the first tunnel on the night of 16 May. Subsequent tunnels were interrupted on 21, 23 and 25 May, and destroyed with Greek fire and vigorous combat. On 23 May, the Byzantines captured and tortured two Turkish officers, who revealed the location of all the Turkish tunnels, which were destroyed.

On 21 May, Mehmed sent an ambassador to Constantinople and offered to lift the siege if they gave him the city. He promised he would allow the Emperor and any other inhabitants to leave with their possessions. He would recognize the Emperor as governor of the Peloponnese. Lastly, he guaranteed the safety of the population that might choose to remain in the city. Constantine XI only agreed to pay higher tributes to the sultan and recognized the status of all the conquered castles and lands in the hands of the Turks as Ottoman possessions. The Emperor was not willing to leave the city without a fight:

Around this time, Mehmed had a final council with his senior officers. Here he encountered some resistance; one of his Viziers, the veteran Halil Pasha, who had always disapproved of Mehmed's plans to conquer the city, now admonished him to abandon the siege in the face of recent adversity. Zagan Pasha argued against Halil Pasha and insisted on an immediate attack. Believing that the Byzantine defence was already weakened sufficiently, Mehmed planned to overpower the walls by sheer force and started preparations for a final all-out offensive.

Final assault

Preparations for the final assault began in the evening of 26 May and continued to the next day. For 36 hours after the war council decided to attack, the Ottomans extensively mobilized their manpower for the general offensive. Prayer and resting was then granted to the soldiers on 28 May before the final assault would be launched. On the Byzantine side, a small Venetian fleet of 12 ships, after having searched the Aegean, reached the Capital on 27 May and reported to the Emperor that no large Venetian relief fleet was on its way. On 28 May, as the Ottoman army prepared for the final assault, mass religious processions were held in the city. In the evening, a solemn last ceremony of Vespers was held in the Hagia Sophia, in which the Emperor with representatives and nobility of both the Latin and Greek churches partook. Up until this point, the Ottomans had fired 5,000 shots from their cannons using 55,000 pounds of gunpowder. Criers roamed the camp to the sound of the blasting horns, rousing the Ghazis:

Shortly after midnight on Tuesday 29 May, the offensive began. The Christian troops of the Ottoman Empire attacked first, followed by successive waves of the irregular azaps, who were poorly trained and equipped and Anatolian Turkmen beylik forces who focused on a section of the damaged Blachernae walls in the north-west part of the city. This section of the walls had been built earlier, in the 11th century, and was much weaker. The Turkmen mercenaries managed to breach this section of walls and entered the city but they were just as quickly pushed back by the defenders. Finally, the last wave consisting of elite Janissaries, attacked the city walls. The Genoese general in charge of the defenders on land, Giovanni Giustiniani, was grievously wounded during the attack, and his evacuation from the ramparts caused a panic in the ranks of the defenders.

With Giustiniani's Genoese troops retreating into the city and towards the harbour, Constantine and his men, now left to their own devices, continued to hold their ground against the Janissaries. Constantine's men eventually could not prevent the Ottomans from entering the city and the defenders were overwhelmed at several points along the wall. When Turkish flags were seen flying above the Kerkoporta, a small postern gate that was left open, panic ensued and the defence collapsed. Janissaries, led by Ulubatlı Hasan, pressed forward. Many Greek soldiers ran back home to protect their families, the Venetians retreated to their ships and a few of the Genoese escaped to Galata. The rest surrendered or committed suicide by jumping off the city walls. The Greek houses nearest to the walls were the first to suffer from the Ottomans. It is said that Constantine, throwing aside his purple imperial regalia, led the final charge against the incoming Ottomans, perishing in the ensuing battle in the streets alongside his soldiers. The Venetian Nicolò Barbaro claimed in his diary that Constantine hanged himself at the moment when the Turks broke in at the San Romano gate. Ultimately, his fate remains unknown.

After the initial assault, the Ottoman army fanned out along the main thoroughfare of the city, the Mese, past the great forums and the Church of the Holy Apostles, which Mehmed II wanted to provide as a seat for his newly appointed patriarch to better control his Christian subjects. Mehmed II had sent an advance guard to protect these key buildings.

A few civilians managed to escape. When the Venetians retreated over to their ships, the Ottomans had already taken the walls of the Golden Horn. Luckily for the occupants of the city, the Ottomans were not interested in killing potentially valuable slaves but rather in the loot they could get from raiding the city's houses, so they decided to attack the city instead. The Venetian captain ordered his men to break open the gate of the Golden Horn. Having done so, the Venetians left in ships filled with soldiers and refugees. Shortly after the Venetians left, a few Genoese ships and even the Emperor's ships followed them out of the Golden Horn. This fleet narrowly escaped prior to the Ottoman navy assuming control over the Golden Horn, which was accomplished by midday.

The army converged upon the Augusteum, the vast square that fronted the great church of Hagia Sophia whose bronze gates were barred by a huge throng of civilians inside the building, hoping for divine protection. After the doors were breached, the troops separated the congregation according to what price they might bring in the slave markets. Ottoman casualties are unknown but they are believed by most historians to be severe due to several unsuccessful Ottoman attacks made during the siege and final assault. The Venetian Barbaro observed that blood flowed in the city "like rainwater in the gutters after a sudden storm" and that bodies of Turks and Christians floated in the sea "like melons along a canal".

Atrocities 
According to the Encyclopædia Britannica, Mehmed II "permitted an initial period of looting that saw the destruction of many Orthodox churches", but tried to prevent a complete sack of the city. The looting was extremely thorough in certain parts of the city. On 2 June, the Sultan found the city largely deserted and half in ruins; churches had been desecrated and stripped, houses were no longer habitable, and stores and shops were emptied. He is famously reported to have been moved to tears by this, saying, "What a city we have given over to plunder and destruction."

Looting was carried out on a massive scale by sailors and marines who entered the city via other walls before they had been suppressed by regular troops, who were beyond the main gate. According to David Nicolle, the ordinary people were treated better by their Ottoman conquerors than their ancestors had been by Crusaders back in 1204, stating that only about 4,000 Greeks died in the siege, while according to a Venetian Senate report, 50 Venetian noblemen and over 500 other Venetian civilians died during the siege. Many of the riches of the city were already looted in 1204, leaving only limited loot to the Ottomans.

Other sources claim far more brutal and successful pillaging by the Ottoman invaders. Leonard of Chios made accounts of the atrocities that followed the fall of Constantinople stated the Ottoman invaders pillaged the city, murdered or enslaved tens of thousands of people, and raped nuns, women and children:

During three days of pillaging, the Ottoman invaders captured children and took them away to their tents, and became rich by plundering the imperial palace and the houses of Constantinople. The Ottoman official Tursun Beg wrote:

If any citizens of Constantinople tried to resist, they were slaughtered. According to Niccolò Barbaro, "all through the day the Turks made a great slaughter of Christians through the city". According to Makarios Melissenos:

The women of Constantinople suffered from rape at the hands of Ottoman forces. According to historian Philip Mansel, widespread persecution of the city's civilian inhabitants took place, resulting in thousands of murders and rapes. The vast majority of the citizens of Constantinople (30,000-50,000) were forced to become slaves.

“They made the people of the city slaves and killed their emperor, and the gazis embraced their pretty girls", confirm Ottoman Chroniclers.

According to Nicolas de Nicolay, slaves were displayed naked at the city's slave market, and young girls could be purchased. The elder refugees in the Hagia Sophia were slaughtered and the women raped. George Sphrantzes says that people of both genders were raped inside Hagia Sophia. According to Steven Runciman most of the elderly and the infirm/wounded and sick who were refugees inside the churches were killed, and the remainder were chained up and sold into slavery.

“Everywhere there was misfortune, everyone was touched by pain” when Mehmed entered the city. “There were lamentations and weeping in every house, screaming in the crossroads, and sorrow in all churches; the groaning of grown men and the shrieking of women accompanied looting, enslavement, separation, and rape.”Mehmed entered the Hagia Sophia, “marveling at the sight” of the grand basilica. Witnessing a Ghazi wildly hammering at the marble floor, he asked what he was doing. "It is for the Faith!” the Ghazi said. Mehmed cut him down with his Kilij: “Be satisfied with the booty and the captives; the buildings of the city belong to me.”

During the festivities, “and as he had promised his viziers and his other officers,” Mehmed had the “wretched citizens of Constantinople” dragged before them and “ordered many of them to be hacked to pieces, for the sake of entertainment.”

Byzantine historian Doukas claims that, while drunk during his victory banquet, the Sultan ordered the Grand Duke Loukas Notaras to give his youngest son to him for his pleasure. He replied that “it would be far better for me to die than hand over my own child to be despoiled by him.” Mehmed was enraged after hearing this and ordered Loukas to be executed. Before his death, Notaras supposedly said that “Him who was crucified for us, died and arose”’ and urged his horrified sons to reject the advances of Mehmed and not fear the outcome. Their father's words encouraged them, and they were also “were ready to die”. They are also said to have been executed. However, American researcher and professor Walter G. Andrew doubts the authenticity of this story, citing the similarities with the earlier story of Saint Pelagius, he states that, “it is likely that Doukas's tale owes more to Saint Pelagius and a long history of attempts to portray Muslims as morally inferior than to anything that actually happened during the conquest of Constantinople/Istanbul."

Aftermath 

Mehmed II granted his soldiers three days to plunder the city, as he had promised them and in accordance with the custom of the time. Soldiers fought over the possession of some of the spoils of war. On the third day of the conquest, Mehmed II ordered all looting to stop and issued a proclamation that all Christians who had avoided capture or who had been ransomed could return to their homes without further molestation, although many had no homes to return to, and many more had been taken captive and not ransomed. Byzantine historian George Sphrantzes, an eyewitness to the fall of Constantinople, described the Sultan's actions:

The Hagia Sophia was converted into a mosque, but the Greek Orthodox Church was allowed to remain intact and Gennadius Scholarius was appointed Patriarch of Constantinople. This was once thought to be the origin of the Ottoman millet system; however, it is now considered a myth and no such system existed in the fifteenth century.

The fall of Constantinople shocked many Europeans, who viewed it as a catastrophic event for their civilization. Many feared other European Christian kingdoms would suffer the same fate as Constantinople. Two possible responses emerged amongst the humanists and churchmen of that era: Crusade or dialogue. Pope Pius II strongly advocated for another Crusade, while the German Nicholas of Cusa supported engaging in a dialogue with the Ottomans.

The Morean (Peloponnesian) fortress of Mystras, where Constantine's brothers Thomas and Demetrius ruled, constantly in conflict with each other and knowing that Mehmed would eventually invade them as well, held out until 1460. Long before the fall of Constantinople, Demetrius had fought for the throne with Thomas, Constantine, and their other brothers John and Theodore. Thomas escaped to Rome when the Ottomans invaded Morea while Demetrius expected to rule a puppet state, but instead was imprisoned and remained there for the rest of his life. In Rome, Thomas and his family received some monetary support from the Pope and other Western rulers as Byzantine emperor in exile, until 1503. In 1461 the independent Byzantine state in Trebizond fell to Mehmed.

Constantine XI had died without producing an heir, and had Constantinople not fallen he likely would have been succeeded by the sons of his deceased elder brother, who were taken into the palace service of Mehmed after the fall of Constantinople. The oldest boy, renamed Murad, became a personal favourite of Mehmed and served as Beylerbey (Governor-General) of Rumeli (the Balkans). The younger son, renamed Mesih Pasha, became Admiral of the Ottoman fleet and Sancak Beg (Governor) of the Province of Gallipoli. He eventually served twice as Grand Vizier under Mehmed's son, Bayezid II.

With the capture of Constantinople, Mehmed II had acquired the future capital of his kingdom, albeit one in decline due to years of war. The loss of the city was a crippling blow to Christendom, and it exposed the Christian West to a vigorous and aggressive foe in the East. The Christian reconquest of Constantinople remained a goal in Western Europe for many years after its fall to the Ottoman Empire.  Rumours of Constantine XI's survival and subsequent rescue by an angel led many to hope that the city would one day return to Christian hands. Pope Nicholas V called for an immediate counter-attack in the form of a crusade, however no European powers wished to participate, and the Pope resorted to sending a small fleet of 10 ships to defend the city. The short lived Crusade immediately came to an end and as Western Europe entered the 16th century, the age of Crusading began to come to an end.

For some time Greek scholars had gone to Italian city-states, a cultural exchange begun in 1396 by Coluccio Salutati, chancellor of Florence, who had invited Manuel Chrysoloras, to lecture at the University of Florence. After the conquest many Greeks, such as John Argyropoulos and Constantine Lascaris, fled the city and found refuge in the Latin West, bringing with them knowledge and documents from the Greco-Roman tradition to Italy and other regions that further propelled the Renaissance. Those Greeks who stayed behind in Constantinople mostly lived in the Phanar and Galata districts of the city. The Phanariotes, as they were called, provided many capable advisers to the Ottoman rulers.

A severed head that was claimed to belong to Byzantine Emperor Constantine XI Palaiologos was found and presented to Mehmed and nailed onto a column. While standing before the head, the sultan in his speech said:

Mehmed then ordered the severed head be skinned, stuffed with bran, and “sent as a symbol of victory to the governors of Persia and Arabia”, in order to remind them that "it was a Turk who did what for centuries they could not."

The news spread rapidly across the Islamic world. In Egypt “good tidings were proclaimed, and Cairo decorated” to celebrate “this greatest of conquests.” The Sharif of Mecca wrote to Mehmed, calling the Sultan “the one who has aided Islam and the Muslims, the Sultan of all kings and sultans,”. The fact that Constantinople, which was long “known for being indomitable in the eyes of all,” as the Sharif of Mecca said, had fallen and that the Prophet Muhammad's prophecy came true shocked the Islamic world and filled it with a great jubilation and rapture.

Third Rome

Byzantium is a term used by modern historians to refer to the later Roman Empire. In its own time, the Empire ruled from Constantinople (or "New Rome" as some people call it, although this was a laudatory expression that was never an official title) and was simply considered as "the Roman Empire." The fall of Constantinople led competing factions to lay claim to being the inheritors of the Imperial mantle. Russian claims to Byzantine heritage clashed with those of the Ottoman Empire's own claim. In Mehmed's view, he was the successor to the Roman Emperor, declaring himself Kayser-i Rum, literally "Caesar of Rome", that is, of the Roman Empire, though he was remembered as "the Conqueror".

Stefan Dušan, Tsar of Serbia, and Ivan Alexander, Tsar of Bulgaria, both made similar claims, regarding themselves as legitimate heirs to the Roman Empire. Other potential claimants, such as the Republic of Venice and the Holy Roman Empire have disintegrated into history.

Impact on the Churches
Pope Pius II believed that the Ottomans would persecute Greek Orthodox Christians and advocated for another crusade at the Council of Mantua in 1459.

Legacy

Legends
There are many legends in Greece surrounding the Fall of Constantinople. It was said that the partial lunar eclipse that occurred on 22 May 1453 represented a fulfilment of a prophecy of the city's demise.

Four days later, the whole city was blotted out by a thick fog, a condition unknown in that part of the world in May. When the fog lifted that evening, a strange light was seen playing about the dome of the Hagia Sophia, which some interpreted as the Holy Spirit departing from the city. "This evidently indicated the departure of the Divine Presence, and its leaving the City in total abandonment and desertion, for the Divinity conceals itself in cloud and appears and again disappears."

For others, there was still a distant hope that the lights were the campfires of the troops of John Hunyadi who had come to relieve the city. It is possible that all these phenomena were local effects of the cataclysmic 1452/1453 mystery eruption which occurred around the time of the siege. The "fire" seen may have been an optical illusion due to the reflection of intensely red twilight glow by clouds of volcanic ash high in the atmosphere.

Another legend holds that two priests saying divine liturgy over the crowd disappeared into the cathedral's walls as the first Turkish soldiers entered. According to the legend, the priests will appear again on the day that Constantinople returns to Christian hands. Another legend refers to the Marble Emperor (Constantine XI), holding that an angel rescued the emperor when the Ottomans entered the city, turning him into marble and placing him in a cave under the earth near the Golden Gate, where he waits to be brought to life again (a variant of the sleeping hero legend). However many of the myths surrounding the disappearance of Constantine were developed later and little evidence can be found to support them even in friendly primary accounts of the siege.

Cultural impact

Guillaume Dufay composed several songs lamenting the fall of the Eastern church, and the duke of Burgundy, Philip the Good, avowed to take up arms against the Turks. However, as the growing Ottoman power from this date on coincided with the Protestant Reformation and subsequent Counter-Reformation, the recapture of Constantinople became an ever-distant dream. Even France, once a fervent participant in the Crusades, became an ally of the Ottomans.

Nonetheless, depictions of Christian coalitions taking the city and of the late Emperor's resurrection by Leo the Wise persisted.

29 May 1453, the day of the fall of Constantinople, fell on a Tuesday, and since then Tuesday has been considered an unlucky day by Greeks generally.

Impact on the Renaissance

The migration waves of Byzantine scholars and émigrés in the period following the sacking of Constantinople and the fall of Constantinople in 1453 is considered by many scholars key to the revival of Greek and Roman studies that led to the development of the Renaissance humanism and science. These émigrés were grammarians, humanists, poets, writers, printers, lecturers, musicians, astronomers, architects, academics, artists, scribes, philosophers, scientists, politicians and theologians. They brought to Western Europe the far greater preserved and accumulated knowledge of Byzantine civilization. According to the Encyclopædia Britannica: "Many modern scholars also agree that the exodus of Greeks to Italy as a result of this event marked the end of the Middle Ages and the beginning of the Renaissance".

Renaming of the city

Ottomans used the Arabic transliteration of the city's name "Qosṭanṭīniyye" (القسطنطينية) or "Kostantiniyye", as can be seen in numerous Ottoman documents. Islambol (Full of Islam) or Islambul (find Islam) or Islam(b)ol (old Turkic: be Islam), both in Turkish, were folk-etymological adaptations of Istanbul created after the Ottoman conquest of 1453 to express the city's new role as the capital of the Islamic Ottoman Empire. It is first attested shortly after the conquest, and its invention was ascribed by some contemporary writers to Mehmed II himself.

The name of Istanbul is thought to be derived from the Greek phrase īs tīmbolī(n) (translit. eis tēn pólin, "to the City"), and it is claimed that it had already spread among the Turkish populace of the Ottoman Empire before the conquest.  However, Istanbul only became the official name of the city in 1930 by the revised Turkish Postal Law.

Primary sources
For the fall of Constantinople, Marios Philippides and Walter Hanak list 15 eyewitness accounts (13 Christian and 2 Turkish) and 20 contemporary non-eyewitness accounts (13 Italian).

Eyewitness accounts
 Mehmed Şems el-Mille ve'd Din, Sufi holy man who gives an account in a letter
 Tursun Beg, wrote a history entitled Tarih-i Abu'l Fath
 George Sphrantzes, the only Greek eyewitness who wrote about it, but his laconic account is almost entirely lacking in narrative
 Leonard of Chios, wrote a report to Pope Nicholas V
 Nicolò Barbaro, physician on a Venetian galley who kept a journal
 Angelino Giovanni Lomellini, Venetian podestà of Pera who wrote a report dated 24 June 1453
 Jacopo Tetaldi, Florentine merchant
 Isidore of Kiev, Orthodox churchman who wrote eight letters to Italy
 Benvenuto, Anconitan consul in Constantinople
 Ubertino Puscolo, Italian poet learning Greek in the city, wrote an epic poem
 Eparkhos and Diplovatatzes, two refugees whose accounts has become garbled through multiple translations
 Nestor Iskander, youthful eyewitness who wrote a Slavonic account
 Samile the Vladik, bishop who, like Eparkhos and Diplovatatzes, fled as a refugee to Wallachia
 Konstantin Mihailović, Serbian who fought on the Ottoman side
 a report by some Franciscan prisoners of war who later came to Bologna

Non-eyewitness accounts
 Doukas, a Byzantine Greek historian, one of the most important sources for the last decades and eventual fall of the Byzantine Empire to the Ottomans
 Laonikos Chalkokondyles, a Byzantine Greek historian
 Michael Kritoboulos, a Byzantine Greek historian
 Makarios Melissourgos, 16th-century historian who augmented the account of Sphrantzes, not very reliably
 Paolo Dotti, Venetian official on Crete whose account is based on oral reports
 Fra Girolamo's letter from Crete to Domenico Capranica
 Lauro Quirini, wrote a report to Pope Nicholas V from Crete based on oral reports
 Aeneas Silvius Piccolomini (Pope Pius II), wrote an account based on written sources
 Henry of Soemmern, wrote a letter dated 11 September 1453 in which he cites his sources of information
 Niccola della Tuccia, whose Cronaca di Viterbo written in the autumn of 1453 contains unique information
 Niccolò Tignosi da Foligno, Expugnatio Constantinopolitana, part of a letter to a friend
 Filippo da Rimini, Excidium Constantinopolitanae urbis quae quondam Bizantium ferebatur
 Antonio Ivani da Sarzana, Expugnatio Constantinopolitana, part of a letter to the duke of Urbino
 Nikolaos Sekoundinos, read a report before the Venetian Senate, the Pope and the Neapolitan court
 Giacomo Languschi, whose account is embedded in the Venetian chronicle of Zorzi Dolfin, had access to eyewitnesses
 John Moskhos, wrote a poem in honour of Loukas Notaras
 Adamo di Montaldo, De Constantinopolitano excidio ad nobilissimum iuvenem Melladucam Cicadam, which contains unique information
 Ashikpashazade, included a chapter on the conquest in his Tarih-i al-i Osman
 Neshri, included a chapter on the conquest in his universal history
 Evliya Çelebi, 17th-century traveller who collected local traditions of the conquest

In Popular Culture 
The Fall of Constantinople is depicted in Season 1 of the Netflix series Rise of Empires:  Ottoman.

Notes

References

Bibliography

Further reading 
 Babinger, Franz (1992): Mehmed the Conqueror and His Time. Princeton University Press. .
 Fletcher, Richard A.: The Cross and the Crescent (2005) Penguin Group .
 Harris, Jonathan (2007): Constantinople: Capital of Byzantium. Hambledon/Continuum. .
 Harris, Jonathan (2010): The End of Byzantium. Yale University Press. .
 
 
 
 
 Philippides, Marios and Walter K. Hanak, The Siege and the Fall of Constantinople in 1453, Ashgate, Farnham and Burlington 2011.
 Smith, Michael Llewellyn, "The Fall of Constantinople", in History Makers magazine No. 5 (London, Marshall Cavendish, Sidgwick & Jackson, 1969) p. 192.
 Wheatcroft, Andrew (2003):  The Infidels: The Conflict Between Christendom and Islam, 638–2002. Viking Publishing .
 Wintle, Justin (2003): The Rough Guide History of Islam. Rough Guides. .

External links 

 The Siege of Constantinople As The Islamic World Sees it
 World History Encyclopedia – 1453: The Fall of Constantinople
 Constantinople Siege & Fall, BBC Radio 4 discussion with Roger Crowley, Judith Herrin & Colin Imber (In Our Time, 28 Dec. 2006)

 
1453 in the Ottoman Empire
1450s in the Byzantine Empire
Constantinople 1453
Conflicts in 1453
15th-century massacres
East–West Schism
Constantinople 1453
Constantinople 1453
1453
Constantinople
15th century in Istanbul
Massacres in the Byzantine Empire
Constantinople
Looting
Massacres committed by the Ottoman Empire